Darnileh-ye Aziz (also Romanized as Dārnīleh-ye ʿAzīz; also known as Dārnīleh) is a village in Ozgoleh Rural District, Ozgoleh District, Salas-e Babajani County, Kermanshah Province, Iran. At the 2006 census, its population was 137, in 29 families.

References 

Populated places in Salas-e Babajani County